Behniwal may refer to:

Beniwal, a jatt clan of Punjab and surroundings
Behniwal, Punjab, a village in Mansa district, Punjab
Kokri Behniwal, a village in Moga district, Punjab